Alexander Stewart McLardy (1867 – 1913) was a Scottish professional footballer who played as a forward. He was part of the Abercorn side that won the Renfrewshire Challenge Cup and the Paisley Charity Cup in Season 1888–89, then joined Burnley in England's Football League, returning to Abercorn three years later. He was selected for the Scottish Football League XI and played in two international trials, but never gained a full cap for Scotland.

References

Sources

1867 births
1913 deaths
Footballers from Paisley, Renfrewshire
Scottish footballers
Association football forwards
St Mirren F.C. players
Burnley F.C. players
English Football League players
Scottish Football League players
Abercorn F.C. players
Scottish Football League representative players